Anathallis jesupiorum is a species of orchid plant native to Ecuador.

References 

jesupiorum
Flora of Ecuador